Capital punishment in Bulgaria was abolished on December 12, 1998 with the last execution, that of attempted saboteur Georgi Alinski, having been carried out on November 4, 1989. The Parliament of Bulgaria had introduced a moratorium on July 7, 1990 and protocol number six of the European Convention on Human Rights came into force on October 1, 1999.

Notable executions in the 20th-century

References

External links
 The end of capital punishment in Europe.

See also 
 Krum's laws

Legal history of Bulgaria
Bulgari
Death in Bulgaria
Human rights abuses in Bulgaria
1990 disestablishments in Bulgaria